is a Japanese footballer who is the captain of J1 League side Gamba Osaka.   He is also a Japanese international and his regular playing position is centre back.

Club career

Born in Toyohashi in Aichi, central Japan, Miura moved to Osaka to do his schooling.   After graduating from Toin Senior High School he was signed by J1 side Shimizu S-Pulse in 2013.

Miura played in 16 league matches across his first 3 seasons in Shizuoka before establishing himself as a regular in 2016 following the club's relegation to Japan's second tier.   He played 29 J2 matches to help S-Pulse to 2nd place in the final standings and promotion back to Japan's top flight.

His performances for Shimizu brought him to the attention of Gamba Osaka who signed him ahead of the 2017 season.   Miura played in all 34 league games as well as 11 in the cup in his first season in Osaka.   Gamba changed head coaches ahead of the 2018 campaign with Brazilian Levir Culpi taking over from the long-serving Kenta Hasegawa and he named Miura as his captain, taking over the role from veteran Yasuhito Endō.

Miura once again played every league game in 2018 which would prove to be a disappointing year for Gamba who struggled badly in the first half of the year under Culpi's leadership but improved markedly towards the end of the campaign under new head-coach Tsuneyasu Miyamoto, eventually ending up in 9th place in the final standings.

National Team Career

Miura earned his first call up to Japan's national team, then managed by Vahid Halilhodžić, ahead of the 2017 EAFF E-1 Football Championship and debuted in the 2-1 win over China on December 12.   He also played in the 4-1 defeat to South Korea 4 days later which saw Japan finish as runners-up in the tournament.

His next international involvement came in September 2018 under new national team coach Hajime Moriyasu.   Miura played the full 90 minutes of a 3-0 home friendly win over Costa Rica and subsequently featured in the 4-3 victory over Uruguay in October and the 4-0 rout of Kyrgyzstan in November.

Miura was named in Japan's squad for the 2019 AFC Asian Cup in the United Arab Emirates.   He played one game at the tournament, the 2-1 victory over Uzbekistan on 17 January 2019.

Club Statistics

Reserves performance

National team statistics
Last Update: 18 December 2019

International goals
Scores and results list Japan's goal tally first.

References

External links

1995 births
Living people
Association football people from Aichi Prefecture
Japanese footballers
J1 League players
J2 League players
J3 League players
Shimizu S-Pulse players
J.League U-22 Selection players
Gamba Osaka players
Association football defenders
Japan international footballers
2019 AFC Asian Cup players